Freddy Daruwala (born 1983/1984) is an Indian model and actor based in Mumbai, Maharashtra, predominantly known for his roles as the Sleeper Cell's Head opposite Akshay Kumar in the Bollywood film Holiday. He has starred in over 12 films across various languages, including Telugu, Gujarati and Hindi. He has been titled as the Most Desirable Man by Ahmedabad Times in 2018 and 2020. He last appeared in ZEE5's action crime thriller series Poison in 2019 that starred Arbaaz Khan and Riya Sen. He has been signed to play a lead in The Incomplete Man.

Personal life
Born into a middle-class family in Surat, Gujarat, Freddy is half Parsi and half Gujarati. He holds a Master of Business Administration. He is married to Crystal Variava, a doctor and they have 2 sons.

Filmography

Web series

References

External links

Living people
Indian male models
Male actors in Hindi cinema
Indian male film actors
1980s births
Parsi people
Gujarati people
People from Surat